Randa Apparel & Accessories is a manufacturer, distributor, and marketer of men's, women's, and children's clothing and apparel, belts, wallets, neckwear, neckties, jewelry, slippers, hats, gloves, and leather goods.

The founder's family had been in the neckwear business since 1910 and the current company was incorporated in 1935, and now has a worldwide clientele. Through the company's Haggar Clothing Co. and Tribal divisions, Randa distributes men's and women's clothing.

Randa is a privately owned company. 2019 sales exceeded $1 billion.

Randa global offices
The company employs over 2,000 associates worldwide.
 Randa has 27 offices in 12 countries.
 Randa US Offices are located in New York City, NY; Chicago, IL; New Orleans, LA; Dallas, TX, Fort Worth, TX; and Reno, NV. In January 2013, Randa Accessories consolidated its New York City offices into a new headquarters at 417 Fifth Avenue.
 Randa International offices are located in Canada, Mexico, Guatemala, the United Kingdom, India, South Africa, Australia, and China.
 Randa Apparel & Accessories has sourcing facilities located in Shanghai, Zhejiang Province, Fujian Province and; Guatemala City, Guatemala
 North American distribution facilities are located in New Orleans, LA; Reno, NV; Fort Worth, TX; and Mississauga, Ontario.

Licensed brands

Randa produces and distributes products under license from many brands including:  Levi's, Dockers, Tommy Bahama, Kenneth Cole, Tommy Hilfiger, Calvin Klein, Ben Sherman, Chaps, Columbia Sportswear Company, Dickies, Cole Haan, Guess!, Hanesbrands, Haggar Clothing, Tribal Fashion, and Jessica Simpson.

Proprietary brands

Randa also owns and markets brands including Haggar Clothing, Tribal, Exact Fit, Swank, Countess Mara, Mustang, Louis Raphael, and Damen+Hastings.

Randa Accessories partnered with Ryan Seacrest to create the "Ryan Seacrest Distinction" brand for apparel and accessories.

Randa Divisions
 Randa Accessories
 Randa Neckwear & Jewelry
 Randa Belts and Furnishings
 Randa Wallets and Seasonal Accessories (headwear, footwear, gifts)
 Randa Logistics
 Ransal Australia
 Humphreys Accessories (now called Randa Leather Goods)
 Wembley Apparel (Randa South Africa)
 Countess Mara Neckwear (now part of Randa Neckwear)
 Woodstock Neckwear (now part of Randa UK, and Randa Scotland)
 Forsythe Neckwear (now part of Randa Canada)
 Swank, Inc.
  Globales S.A. (dba Tata Leather Factory)- a Randa Affiliate
 Equator S.A. - a Randa Accessories Affiliate
 R&S Sales
 Randa Digital Labs
 Haggar Clothing Co.
 Tribal Inc.

History and timeline

Randa Accessories began as the Spiegel Neckwear company in 1910 and has experienced dramatic growth.

 1910, Spiegel family enters the neckwear business from the Lower East Side of Manhattan, New York City, NY
 1935, Randa Neckwear is founded by Rosenberg and Apakater
 1965, Herbert Spiegel acquires Randa Neckwear
 1985, Established Randa International, S.r.L., Design Center - Como, Italy
 1993, Acquired Woodstock Neckwear Ltd. London, UK
 1995, Acquired Randa Canada (formerly Forsythe Neckwear) Mississauga, Ontario
 1997, Acquired WEMCO - New Orleans, LA
 1998, Acquired Countess Mara - New York City, NY
 1999, Established Randa Shanghai -Shanghai, China
 2001, Acquired Humphreys Accessories- Chicago, IL
 2002, Established Randa Shanghai - Shengzhou, China
 2002, Established MCG: Market Connect Group - Chalfont, PA
 2002, Established Ransal - Melbourne, Australia
 2002, Established Randa UK, Ltd. -London, UK
 2003, Acquired Trafalgar Company - Norwalk, CT
 2005, Established Wembley (Pty) Ltd. - Johannesburg, South Africa
 2006, Established Humphreys Far East- Xiamen, China
 2007, Acquired Badanco Luggage - Totowa, NJ
 2007, Partners in Progress Award April 2008 (Ontario, Canada)
 2008, Established Randa Luggage, UK- London, UK
 2008, Partner of the Year award August 2008 (New York, NY)
 2009, Established Randa Logistics, Reno, Nevada.
 2009, Named one of New Orleans "best places to work"
 2010, Established Randa Luggage Headquarters in Bloomfield, New Jersey
 2010, Randa Accessories celebrates its 100th anniversary
 2010, Mayor Richard M. Daley and the City of Chicago issue a proclamation honoring Randa's 100th anniversary
 2010, MCG Headquarters moved to new facilities in Bloomfield, NJ
 2011, Randa Accessories opens new facility in Rosemont, IL
 2012, Trafalgar Leather Goods 40th Anniversary New York City, NY
 2012, Randa signs Jonathan Adler license for neckwear
 2012, Randa to acquire Swank, Inc.
 2012, Randa completes its acquisition of Swank on May 17, 2012 
 2012, Randa makes strategic and financial investment in  Globales S.A. (Tata)
 2013, Randa Accessories consolidated its New York City offices into a new headquarters at 417 Fifth Avenue.
 2013, Randa makes strategic and financial investment in Equator S.A. opening two additional offices in South Africa
 2013, Randa announces $25 million investment in infrastructure
 2014, Randa opens a new 530,000 sq. ft. logistics center in Reno, Nevada
 2014, Randa partners with Ryan Seacrest to create the Ryan Seacrest Distinction brand for apparel & accessories.
 2015, "Randa Logistics Center receives LEED Gold Certification at Tahoe-Reno Industrial Center."
 2015, Randa rebrands itself as "Randa: Leading With Accessories."
 2015, Randa opens "Belt Lab" to grow worldwide market by 30%.
 2016, Randa acquires the operations of R&S Sales and becomes the largest supplier of seasonal footwear.
 2017, Randa creates "Randa Digital Labs" to leverage emerging digital information and technology.
 2018, Randa submits offer to acquire Perry Ellis International
 2019, Randa's in-store service division, MCG: Market Connect Group, acquires Merchandise Management Company (MMC).
 2019, Randa's expands its belt factory  Globales S.A. (Tata) to a production capacity of 18 million units per year.
 2019, Randa Acquires the Haggar Clothing Co.
 2019, Randa Acquires Tribal Fashion, a leading women's sportswear company. 
 2020, Randa to Sell MCG: Market Connect Group to Winston Retail.
 2020, Randa Sells Trafalgar Leather Goods to Phoenix Leather Goods 
 2020, Randa Acquires Technology Assets of Bombfell 
 2020, Randa Rebrands as "Randa Apparel Accessories."

Design

Randa design centers are located in New York City, USA; Dallas, USA; Montreal, Canada; London, England; Chicago, USA; Guatemala City, Guatemala; Cape Town, South Africa and Shanghai, China. The company maintains extensive archives of patterns, materials, hardware, and finished products.

Marketing

Randa develops advertising, packaging, point of sale materials, e-commerce and B2B websites, video production, public relations and other marketing materials in-house via a centralized marketing and creative services department.

The marketing teams and Randa and Haggar also identify new channels of distribution and consumer segments, and manages the extensive qualitative, qualitative and predictive consumer insights program, and create go-to-market strategies and tactics for new and existing brands via in-store and omni-channel best practices.

Marketing also identifies brand and channel opportunities via in-depth market analysis, develops or repositions brands - Haggar, Ryan Seacrest Distinction, Damen+Hastings, Countess Mara - creates in-store architecture, fixtures, web sites, social media campaigns and other marketing materials.

Customers

Randa provides products to many department and specialty stores worldwide, including Nordstrom, Bloomingdales, Macy's, JC Penney, Kohl's, Walmart, Myer, John Lewis, River Island, Harrods, Edgars, Myer, Next, The Bay, Liverpool, El Palacio de Hierro, Galeries Lafayette, and El Corte Inglés.

Randa also sells its products via direct-to-consumer channels including QVC, Amazon.com, JCP.com, Kohls.com, Macys.com, Haggar.com, TrafalgarStore.com, Nordstrom.com, Zappos.com, eBags.com.

Distribution and logistics

Randa Accessories has over 1 million square feet of modern distribution space located near global transportation hubs; including New Orleans, New York City, Reno, Fort Worth, Edinburgh, Melbourne, Johannesburg, and Toronto. Together, these facilities have capacity to ship more than 100 million units and 1 million consumer direct shipments, annually. In 2013 and 2014, the company announced investments of $25 million in its logistic's infrastructure. WWD An additional $25 million logistics and IT investment was made in 2016 & 2017.

Manufacturing

Randa Accessories' factory partner  Globales S.A. (dba: TATA) is the world's largest manufacturer of leather belts. Tata was founded in 1985 to export Guatemalan leather goods and has evolved into a major manufacturer of dress and casual belts. In 2012, Randa Accessories increased its equity position in Equator, SA; including investment in a Durban, South Africa belt factory.

In 2019, Randa invested in Tata for a major expansion, raising production capacity to over 18 million units annually.

Swank, Inc.

Swank was founded in 1897 and is engaged in the importation, sale and distribution of men's and women's belts and men's leather accessories, suspenders, and jewelry. Swank distributes its products to retail outlets throughout the United States and in numerous foreign countries. These products are distributed under the names "Kenneth Cole", "Tommy Hilfiger", "Nautica", "Geoffrey Beene", "Guess?", "Tumi", "Buffalo David Bitton", "Chaps", "Pierre Cardin", "US Polo Association", and "Swank". Swank also distributes men's jewelry and leather items to retailers under private labels.

Swank, Inc. (formerly publicly traded as "SNKI") was acquired by Randa Accessories on May 17, 2012, and taken private.

In-store merchandising - MCG: Market Connect Group

Originally servicing Randa's internal requirements for in-store merchandising, Randa purchased MCG in 2002. Today MCG: Market Connect Group MCGConnect.com, is America's largest merchandise services company servicing department stores, mid-tier stores and home stores.  MCG provides in-store demonstrations, replenishment, training, brand ambassadors, market intelligence, and other essential in-store merchandising services.

MCG has spent greater than 5 million hours of in-store service with America's leading retailers - over 2 million hours at Macy's, JC Penney and Kohl's alone. MCG has a nationwide network of 4,000 in-store merchandising workers and uses the latest technology to deliver 24/7 scheduling and reporting.

HFN, the journal of the housewares industry, reported that MCG conducted over 20,000 in-store demonstrations in 2013; helping Keurig sell America's #1 single serve coffee maker.

In 2019, MCG acquired Merchandise Management Company (MMC) and Wolfe Retail Services, increasing the size and reach of the company's field service team and service offerings.

In January 2020, Randa entered into an agreement to sell the third-party service division of MCG to Winston Retail. Randa retained the internal service division to support Randa and Haggar brands and products.

Trafalgar Men's Accessories

Trafalgar was founded in 1972 in Norwalk, Connecticut as a luxury manufacturer of men's belts and suspenders.  Randa acquired Trafalgar in 2003.

Trafalgar is the largest producer of silk braces and suspenders, with over 100 unique patterns sold through more than 1,000 points of sale.

Many original patterns were designed by Albert Thurston. In 1820, five years before Nelson's Column was built (to celebrate his life and death on October 21, 1805, at the Battle of Trafalgar) braces and suspenders were first made and sold by Albert Thurston from his emporium at 27 Panton Street, Haymarket, London.

Trafalgar is also a leading producer of exotic leather products.

In September 2020, Randa Sold Trafalgar Leather Goods to Phoenix Leather Goods.

Haggar Clothing Co.

In 1938, Haggar created the first ready-to-wear, finished bottom, pre-cuffed pant. During World War II, the company kept factories running 24 hours a day to supply over 10 million uniforms to the U.S. military. Haggar coined the word "slacks" to be worn during "slack time." By the end of the decade, Haggar had become the largest producer of slacks in the world.
In 1980 the company began production of sport coats, vests, and Haggar "Custom Fit" suits, which allowed customers to purchase jackets and pants separately, creating a new menswear category: "suit separates."

Haggar has over 30 branded brick-and-mortar retail locations, a dedicated direct-to-consumer ecommerce platform, and its products are sold in over 10,000 stores throughout North America.

Tribal

Tribal was founded in 1971 and is the largest women's sportswear supplier to the specialty boutique market in North America, with over 2,400 active accounts.

References

Clothing brands of the United States
Clothing companies established in 1910
1910 establishments in New York (state)